This is a list of the National Register of Historic Places listings in Organ Pipe Cactus National Monument.

This is intended to be a complete list of the properties and districts on the National Register of Historic Places in Organ Pipe Cactus National Monument, Arizona, United States.  The locations of National Register properties and districts for which the latitude and longitude coordinates are included below, may be seen in a Google map.

There are eight properties and districts listed on the National Register in the park.

Current listings 

|--
|}

See also 
 National Register of Historic Places listings in Pima County, Arizona
 National Register of Historic Places listings in Arizona

References